Cirolana cranchii is a species of isopod crustacean.

History and etymology

Cirolana cranchii was described by the English zoologist William Elford Leach in 1818; he named the genus anagramatically after an unknown woman called Caroline/Carolina, and the species after his friend and collector John Cranch.

C. cranchii is the type species of the genus Cirolana, which in turn is the type genus for the family Cirolanidae. The type locality is Cornwall, Great Britain.

Distribution
The species is found around the British Isles and the northwestern coasts of Portugal, Spain and France, with the greatest abundance around the western coasts of Ireland, Cornwall and Brittany. The species has also been recorded from the North Sea, the Mediterranean, and the coasts of Australia. Bruce and Ellis consider only the eastern North Atlantic and Mediterranean records reliable.

Description

The adult male is between 9.0 and 19.1 mm long and about 3 times as long as it is wide. The head (cephalon) lacks a forward-pointing spine (rostral process). The body consists of 11 visible segments each covered in a smooth dorsal scale behind the head, with a triangular tail (pleotelson). There are six joints to the abdomen. The legs are used for walking and have small claws. Tail paddles (uropods) extend beyond the point of the tail. The female has a wider pleotelson and non-angled uropods, and lacks the dense bristles (setae) on these parts. Females are between 9.6 and 19.2 mm long. Young males resemble females.

References

External links
 Photographs

Cymothoida
Crustaceans of the Atlantic Ocean
Crustaceans described in 1818
Taxa named by William Elford Leach